Alan Charles Brownjohn  (born 28 July 1931) is an English poet and novelist. He has also worked as a teacher, lecturer, critic and broadcaster.

Life and work
Alan Brownjohn was born in London and educated at Merton College, Oxford. He taught in schools between 1957 and 1965.

In 1960 he married the writer Shirley Toulson and in 1962 both were elected as Labour councillors in the Wandsworth Metropolitan Borough Council, and Brownjohn stood as the Labour Party candidate for Richmond (Surrey) in the 1964 general election, polling in second place. He and Touslon divorced in 1969.

Brownjohn lectured at Battersea College of Education and South Bank Polytechnic until 1979, when he became a full-time writer. He participated in Philip Hobsbaum's weekly poetry discussion meetings known as The Group, which also included Peter Porter, Martin Bell, Peter Redgrove, George MacBeth and Edward Lucie-Smith.

Brownjohn is a Patron of Humanists UK.

Reviewing Brownjohn's Collected Poems (Enitharmon Press, 2006), Anthony Thwaite wrote in The Guardian: "...he is a social poet in the sense that if people in the future want to know what many lives were like in the second half of the 20th century, they should read Alan Brownjohn - observant, troubled, humane, scrupulous, wry, funny."

Bibliography

Travelers Alone (1954), poems
The Railings (1961), poems
To Clear the River (1964), novel, as John Berrington
Penguin Modern Poets 14 (1965), with Michael Hamburger, Charles Tomlinson
The Lions' Mouths (1967)
A Day by Indirections (1969), broadsheet poem
First I Say This: A Selection of Poems for Reading Aloud (1969), editor
Sandgrains On A Tray (1969)
Woman Reading Aloud (1969) broadsheet poem
Synopsis (1970)
Brownjohn's Beasts (1970)
Transformation Scene (1971) broadside poem
An Equivalent (1971) poem
New Poems 1970-71. A P.E.N. Anthology of Contemporary Poetry (1971), edited with Seamus Heaney and Jon Stallworthy
Warrior's Career (1972)
She Made of It (1974)
A Song of Good Life (1975)
Philip Larkin (1975)
New Poetry 3, Arts Council anthology (1977), edited with Maureen Duffy
A Night in the Gazebo (1980)
Nineteen Poems (1980)
Collected Poems 1952–1983 (1983)
The Old Flea-Pit (1987)
The Observation Car (1990), poems
The Gregory Anthology 1987–1990 (1990), editor with K. W. Gransden
The Way You Tell Them: A Yarn of the Nineties (1990), novel
Inertia Reel (1992), broadside poem
In the Cruel Arcade (1994)
The Long Shadows (1997), novel
Horace by Pierre Corneille (1997), translator
The Cat without E-mail (Enitharmon Press 2001)
A Funny Old Year (2001), novel
The Men Around Her Bed (Enitharmon Press, 2004)
Windows on the Moon (2009), novel
Ludbrooke and Others  (Enitharmon Press, 2010)
A Bottle and Other Poems  (Enitharmon Press, 2015)
parrot poem

References

External links

Alan Brownjohn - Poetry Archive website
Enitharmon Press website
"Alan Brownjohn Papers,1940-2011", Penn State University Libraries
"Overview: Alan Brownjohn", Oxford Reference.

Writers from London
Alumni of Merton College, Oxford
English humanists
English male poets
20th-century English novelists
21st-century English novelists
Fellows of the Royal Society of Literature
1931 births
Living people
English male novelists
20th-century English male writers
21st-century English male writers